The 1965 Ole Miss Rebels football team represented the University of Mississippi in the sport of American football during the 1965 NCAA University Division football season. The team won seven games and lost four. It concluded the season with a 13–7 victory over Auburn in the 1965 Liberty Bowl.

Quarterback Jimmy Heidel led the team in passing, completing 52 of 95 attempts for 586 yards and three touchdowns. Running back Mike Dennis led the team in both rushing and receiving, with 525 and 246 yards respectively. Dennis, defensive tackle Jim Urbanek, and offensive guard Stan Hindman were each first-team selections by both the Associated Press (AP) and United Press International for the 1965 All-SEC football team, and offensive guard Jim Harvey earned second-team honors from the AP.

Schedule

Personnel

References

Ole Miss
Ole Miss Rebels football seasons
Liberty Bowl champion seasons
Ole Miss Rebels football